In enzymology, a 2-hydroxyglutarate synthase is an enzyme that catalyzes the chemical reaction

propanoyl-CoA + H2O + glyoxylate  2-hydroxyglutarate + CoA

The 3 substrates of this enzyme are propanoyl-CoA, H2O, and glyoxylate, whereas its two products are 2-hydroxyglutarate and CoA.

This enzyme belongs to the family of transferases, specifically those acyltransferases that convert acyl groups into alkyl groups on transfer.  The systematic name of this enzyme class is propanoyl-CoA:glyoxylate C-propanoyltransferase (thioester-hydrolysing, 2-carboxyethyl-forming). Other names in common use include 2-hydroxyglutaratic synthetase, 2-hydroxyglutaric synthetase, alpha-hydroxyglutarate synthase, hydroxyglutarate synthase, and 2-hydroxyglutarate glyoxylate-lyase (CoA-propanoylating).  This enzyme participates in c5-branched dibasic acid metabolism.

See also 
 D2HGDH
 L2HGDH
 2-hydroxyglutarate dehydrogenase
 2-Hydroxyglutaric aciduria
 Hydroxyacid-oxoacid transhydrogenase

References 

 

EC 2.3.3
Enzymes of unknown structure